Earle Samuel Canavan (December 5, 1937 – February 9, 2016) was an American racing driver from Fort Johnson, New York.

Canavan immigrated to the United States from Northern Ireland in 1951.  Always interested in racing and speed, he admired Malcolm Campbell and his land speed record car, "The Bluebird".  Canavan built his first gas hot rod during high school.  He was then drafted into the U.S. Army, serving his time at Fort Dix, New Jersey. After service and upon completing his gas rodder, Earle headed to California to compete in NHRA and IHRA events.  As his interest in drag racing increased, he built the only Lincoln-powered AA/Fuel dragster, "The President Lincoln" and competed in National events and exhibitions.  Preparing for entering oval track racing, Canavan became an independent competitor on the SCCA and FIA circuit with an American Motors Javelin.

Canavan participated in NASCAR Winston Cup part-time from 1969 to 1986. His best points result came in 1975 when he drove in 12 of the 30 races and finished 32nd in points. Canavan was an owner-driver, fielding his own car.

He also attempted to qualify for the Indianapolis 500 in 1979 but failed to make the race. He filed another entry for the race in 1981 but it was declined due to his lack of experience in open-wheel cars.

After his on track career, Canavan enjoyed building hot rods.  He also manufactured aftermarket auto parts. working with his own new designs and special compounds.

Canavan was married to Elizabeth (Betty), since 1965.  They had three daughters: Tracy Wager, Heather Gilbert and April Simmons.

Motorsports career results

NASCAR
(key) (Bold – Pole position awarded by qualifying time. Italics – Pole position earned by points standings or practice time. * – Most laps led.)

Grand National Series

Winston Cup Series

Daytona 500

Winston West Series

References

External links
 

1937 births
2016 deaths
NASCAR drivers
People from Montgomery County, New York
Racing drivers from New York (state)